"Telchis" is also the singular form of "Telchines".
In Greek mythology, Telchis ( means "one of the Telchines") may refer to two different or the same characters:

 Telchis or Telchin, the third king of Sicyon who reigned for 20 years. He was the son and successor of Europs, thus grandson of the primeval king Aegialeus. Telchis' heir was his own son Apis to whom was subsequently born Thelxion.

 Telchis, an Argive companion of Thelxion. The two are said to have deposed and killed the Argive Apis, son of Phoroneus and Teledice, who had left no offspring. Apis' death was later avenged on them by Argus Panoptes.

Notes

References 

 Apollodorus, The Library with an English Translation by Sir James George Frazer, F.B.A., F.R.S. in 2 Volumes, Cambridge, MA, Harvard University Press; London, William Heinemann Ltd. 1921. . Online version at the Perseus Digital Library. Greek text available from the same website.
Pausanias, Description of Greece with an English Translation by W.H.S. Jones, Litt.D., and H.A. Ormerod, M.A., in 4 Volumes. Cambridge, MA, Harvard University Press; London, William Heinemann Ltd. 1918. . Online version at the Perseus Digital Library
 Pausanias, Graeciae Descriptio. 3 vols. Leipzig, Teubner. 1903.  Greek text available at the Perseus Digital Library.

Princes in Greek mythology
Mythological kings of Sicyon
Kings in Greek mythology
Sicyonian characters in Greek mythology
Mythology of Argolis